is the 1997 debut album of singer-actress Takako Matsu. Members of Cagnet collaborated with Matsu to compose and write this album.

A collection of music videos, directed by Shunji Iwai for this album, was released on VHS the same year. In 2003, the collection became available on DVD in Japan for a limited time.

In 2011, according to Oricon, Sora no Kagami was still ranked as Matsu's highest best-selling album.

Track listing

Chart positions

References

External links
 Sora no Kagami at Oricon
 

1997 debut albums
Takako Matsu albums